In and Out of Love is the debut album of American R&B singer Cheri Dennis, issued by Bad Boy/Atlantic Records. It was exclusively released digitally through the iTunes Store on November 13, 2007 with physical CDs and LPs made available on February 26, 2008. In and Out of Love debuted at #74 on the Billboard 200, Dennis' debut album was critically acclaimed despite questions being raised concerning the album's sudden halt possibly due to the record label and the music industry's infamous promotional discrepancies, corruption, quid pro quo, fraudulent fine print being added onto contracts, breach of contract, and federal embezzlement.

"Portrait of Love", the second of three singles released, reached #55 on Billboards Hot R&B/Hip-Hop Songs chart. It was originally entitled "Portrait" and featured only Yung Joc, but after the single was leaked, the track title was changed and Gorilla Zoe was added to the song. The first single "I Love You" peaked at #18 on Billboard, and the third single "Pretend" featuring Maino peaked at #116 on the charts. Promotion of third single then ceased due to her record label revoking budgets and refusing to grant funds for the album's future singles because of slow record sales.  The albums was then taken out of print and is available only through digital outlets.

Critical reception

Allmusic editor Matt Rinaldi wrote that Dennis "has been providing hooks for Bad Boy tracks since she first collaborated with Mase in 1999. On her full-length debut, In and Out of Love, Cheri lends her sweet and sensual vocals to 16 hot tracks with production sounds that range from 1990s hip-hop to contemporary neo-soul." Billboard found that In and Out of Love harks back to the early ‘90s, when a green Mary J. Blige [...] created hip-hop soul with songs like “Real Love” and “What's the 411?.” SoulTracks felt that the album made "crystal clear that the production is often only as good as the performer. Cheri lacks the passion to transcend the melody of these mid-tempo love songs, and her unassuming interpretation ultimately gets buried. In and Out of Love doesn't rise to the standards set by many mainstream R&B artists today. Its sound simply plays it too safe and lacks artistic depth [...] She'll get lost in this here-today-gone-tomorrow music industry. Maybe her sophomore effort will be her saving grace and prove that she's indeed a true star on the rise."

Track listingNotes  denotes co-producerSample credits'
"All I Wanna Do" contains an interpolation of "Got My Mind Made Up" (1996) by 2Pac, Tha Dogg Pound, Method Man, & Redman.
"Dropping Out of Love" contains elements of "Sky's the Limit" (1997) by The Notorious B.I.G. and 112, which in turn contains samples of Bobby Caldwell's "My Flame" and D. Train's "Keep On". 
"Waiting" contains a sample from "Forever" (1975) by British soul band Kokomo.

Charts

Release history

References

2007 debut albums
Albums produced by Rodney Jerkins
Albums produced by Timbaland
Albums produced by Ryan Leslie
Bad Boy Records albums
Cheri Dennis albums
Albums produced by Sean Combs
Albums produced by Eric Hudson